Crataegus berberifolia, the barberry hawthorn is a species of hawthorn from the southeastern United States. There are two varieties, C. berberifolia var. berberifolia has 20 stamens with cream-coloured anthers, and  C. berberifolia var. engelmanii has 10 stamens with purplish pink anthers.

References

berberifolia
Trees of the Southeastern United States
Endemic flora of the United States
Flora of the Southeastern United States
Flora without expected TNC conservation status